Józef Płoszko (1867–1931) was a Polish architect of the late 19th and early 20th centuries, and was the author of multiple architectural projects in Baku, Azerbaijan.

Biography
Józef Płoszko was born in 1867. He studied at the Russian Imperial Academy of Arts, but soon left it and joined the Petersburg University of Civil Engineers. After graduation in 1895, Płoszko was sent to Kiev. Working there for two years, he moved to Baku at the invitation of another Polish architect, Józef Gosławski, and took charge as the chief architect at the Baku city administration's construction department. He later became the chief architect of Baku.

Career in Baku
Płoszko had as client the millionaire Musa Naghiyev, but Murtuza Mukhtarov, Nuri Amiraslanov, the Rylskis - a rich Polish family - were also among his clients. In 1907, Agha Musa Naghiyev purchased an area in the center of the city on Nikolayevskaya Street (present Istiglaliyyat Street) and hired architect Płoszko to build a public-charity building in memory of his deceased son. The monumental Ismailiyya building based upon the pattern of the Doge's palace in Venice, was thus Płoszko's first independent work in Baku. This building immediately became one of the main architectural sites of the city. Today, it houses the Presidium of the National Academy of Sciences of Azerbaijan.

After that, Płoszko led construction of two private houses of Musa Naghiyev in the centre of Baku – residential houses on Telefonnaya (now 28 May Street) and Torgovaya Street (now Nizami Street). The architect's second significant order was the construction of the mosque in Vladikavkaz city, which was commissioned by Murtuza Mukhtarov. Płoszko familiarized himself with Islamic architecture on monuments of religious architecture in Baku. A temple finished in 1908 and called "Mukhtarov’s mosque" was built on the coast of the Terek River and is one of the most beautiful buildings of Vladikavkaz.

This mosque was followed by construction of other cultic objects. Płoszko restored Juma Mosque in Shamakhi and commissioned a Catholic Polish church (kostel) in Baku. However, construction of the church couldn't be completed because of a lack of building material, although a scaled down version was eventually finished. In 1918, during the First World War, the mosque was significantly damaged.

Płoszko also constructed the Baku Puppet Theatre in 1908, which was initially used as cinema called "Phenomenon".

In 1909, Płoszko worked on the Catholic Church of Blessed Virgin Mary in Baku, the construction of which was finished in 1912. The church was constructed by funds donated by Polish industrialists – the Rylskis and Witold Zglenicki, founder of petroleum production in the Caspian Sea. The church was constructed in Gothic style, with usage of elements of Polish Gothicism. The building was located in a prestigious part of Bakubut was demolished in the 1930s. Construction of the "Palace of Happiness" in the center of Baku ordered by oil industrialist Murtuza Mukhtarov was Płoszko's next work, which now is a city administration building.

A mansion for Kerbalayi Israfil Hajiyev on Shemakhinskaya Street (now Jabbarli Street) was built by Płoszko in 1910-1912's. He also oversaw the construction of a four-storeyed building in a traditional style on Politseyskaya Street (now Mammadaliyev Street) by the order of the Rylski brothers. In 1919, the first Diplomatic Administration of Poland in the Azerbaijan Democratic Republic was placed in this building, and headed by Stefan Rylski.

Józef Płoszko last work before World War I was the New Europe hotel, which was commissioned by Agha Musa Naghiyev on Qoncharovskaya Street (now Taghiyev Street). The hotel was equipped with state of the art technology of the time, sporting four elevators, sanitary appliances, central heating and concealed wiring. Reinforced concrete was broadly used as a load-bearing structure. As in all previous projects of Płoszko's, the façade of the building was made from local limestone aglay.

Final years and death
Płoszko stayed in Baku after the October Revolution, worked as an engineer with Ziverbey Ahmadbeyov, another famous architect of his time, and participated in discussions of agglomerator city projects on Absheron Peninsula. In 1925, after nearly thirty years living in Azerbaijan, he moved to Warsaw, and then to France. He died in 1931.

Buildings designed by Józef Płoszko

Gallery

References

1867 births
1931 deaths
Architects from Baku
19th-century Polish architects
Art Nouveau architects
Polish engineers who worked in Azerbaijan
Saint-Petersburg State University of Architecture and Civil Engineering alumni